The 2023 Reliance Foundation Development League is the second season of the Reliance Foundation Development League, the first developmental football league organised by Reliance Foundation in technical support with AIFF. The season features 59 teams, divided into nine regions with each team playing around 10 matches during the regional qualifiers season, which will be held across multiple regions of India from 27 February to May 2023. 4 teams will qualify for the Next Gen Cup to be held in the United Kingdom.

Background
Reliance Foundation Youth Sports announced the second season of the RFDL to be started from 27 February with regional qualifiers in Kerala.

Format
The teams would predominantly feature U-21 players, with few overage players allowed as well. Each team will play at least 10 matches in the regional qualifiers. A total of 250+ matches will be played in entire league. 20 teams will qualify for the National group stage from the regional qualifiers. The top-four teams will play in the 2023 Next Gen Cup.

Regional qualifiers
Teams are divided into 9 zones for the regional qualifiers, each containing 4-8 teams.

East region 
</onlyinclude>

Goa region 
</onlyinclude>

Kerala region 
</onlyinclude>

Manipur region 
</onlyinclude>

Mizoram region 
</onlyinclude>

Mumbai region 
</onlyinclude>

North region 
</onlyinclude>

South region 
</onlyinclude>

National group stage
Top 20 teams will qualify from the regional qualifiers to national group stage. National group stage is divided into 4 groups of 5 teams, with winners advancing to the knockout rounds.

References

Youth football leagues
Professional sports leagues in India
Reliance Foundation Development League
Youth football in India
Football in India
Reliance Sports
Indian Super League